The Trinidad Moruga scorpion (Capsicum chinense) is a chili pepper native to the village of Moruga, Trinidad and Tobago. It is one of the spiciest chilies in the world. In 2012,  New Mexico State University's Chile Pepper Institute identified the Trinidad Moruga scorpion as the hottest chili at that time, with heat of 1.2 million Scoville heat units (SHUs). In 2017 according to Guinness World Records, the hottest pepper was the Carolina Reaper, with 1.6 million SHU.

Overview

The yellow cultivar of the Trinidad Moruga Scorpion was created by Wahid Ogeer of Trinidad.

Paul Bosland, a chili pepper expert and director of the Chile Pepper Institute, said, "You take a bite. It doesn't seem so bad, and then it builds and it builds and it builds. So it is quite nasty."

Aside from the heat, the Trinidad Moruga scorpion has a tender fruit-like flavor, which makes it a sweet-hot combination. The pepper can be grown from seeds in most parts of the world. In North America, the growing season varies regionally from the last spring hard frost to the first fall hard frost. Freezing weather ends the growing season and kills the plant, but otherwise they are perennials which grow all year, slowing in colder weather.

See also
Pepper X
Trinidad Scorpion Butch T pepper
List of Capsicum cultivars
 Hottest chili pepper

References

Chili peppers
Capsicum cultivars